Alopoglossus bilineatus is a species of lizard in the family Alopoglossidae. It is  found in Colombia and Ecuador.

References

Alopoglossus
Reptiles described in 1890
Taxa named by George Albert Boulenger
Taxobox binomials not recognized by IUCN